The 1898 Italian Football Championship was a major event in the footballing history of Italy. It was the first FIGC-endorsed league competition which is considered an official predecessor of Serie A.

It was a knock-out tournament involving three clubs from Turin and one from Genoa. All three matches were played at the Velodromo Umberto I in Turin on 8 May, over the course of the one day. The winner of this first-ever season was Genoa.

Result

Semifinals
All matches played on 8 May 1898

Final

References

1897–98 in Italian football
1898
1897–98 in European association football leagues